Ronald N. Weiser is an American businessman and Republican Party activist, donor and financier. Weiser founded a real estate company. He held fundraising roles for the presidential campaigns of George W. Bush and John McCain. He was chairman of the Michigan Republican Party from 2009–2011, 2017–2019, and 2021–present. He was U.S. ambassador to Slovakia during the Bush's first term (2001–2004) and was elected to the Board of Regents of the University of Michigan in 2016.

Early life, education and real estate career
He was born in South Bend, Indiana on July 7, 1945. He graduated in 1966 from the School of Business at University of Michigan.

In 1968, Weiser founded the real estate company McKinley Associates Inc., which is based in Ann Arbor. He has been its Chairman and Chief Executive Officer until 2001, and again upon his return from Slovakia to the present. In 2016, McKinley reportedly had $500 million in annual revenue, and had a real estate portfolio valued at $4.6 billion.

University of Michigan 
In 2014, Weiser unsuccessfully ran for a seat on the Board of Regents of the University of Michigan. He was elected to the Board of Regents in 2016, defeating incumbent Laurence Deitch. Weiser was, at the time of his election, the sole Republican on the Board. In 2020, Weiser was the sole regent to vote against a proposal to allow University of Michigan employees to establish recognized bargaining units by card check (i.e., without formal elections); the proposal passed 6–1. His term expires on January 1, 2025.

By June 2020, Weiser and his wife had donated more than $100 million to the University of Michigan. He announced donations of $50 million in 2015, $10 million in 2018, $10 million in February 2020, and $30 million in June 2020.

The relationship between Weiser's ownership of an Ann Arbor real-estate company, and his roles on the Board of Regents and as a major donor, became controversial during arguments over whether to re-open the university during the COVID-19 pandemic.

Republican Party

Weiser is a major Republican financer and one of Michigan's biggest political donors. He held fundraising roles for the 2000 presidential campaign of George W. Bush and the 2008 presidential campaign of John McCain. He was Ambassador to Slovakia under President George W. Bush from December 5, 2001 to December 19, 2004.

Weiser was Michigan Republican State Finance Chair in 2005 to 2006. He first became chairman of the Michigan Republican Party in 2009, when he ran unopposed. He held the position from 2009 to 2011, and again from 2017 to 2019. Weiser played a key role in the passage of "right-to-work law" legislation enacted by the Michigan Legislature. In a 2019 editorial, the Detroit News credited Weiser as the architect of "a campaign strategy and a fundraising machine that paved the way for a series of Republican victories" in Michigan, allowing the Republicans to hold complete control of the state government for eight years, even though the state usually leans Democratic. In 2021, Weiser defeated the incumbent chair, Laura Cox, amid an acrimonious internal party feud sparked by Cox's allegations that Weiser was involved in two payoff schemes. Weiser denied the allegation made by Cox.

In February 2011 he was appointed as co-chair of the Republican National Committee (RNC)'s National Finance Transition Committee. He was the RNC's National Finance Chair from April 2011 to February 2013.

Weiser was selected in 2016 to lead the Republican National Committee's fundraising efforts for Donald Trump. Weiser donated $50,000 to The MRP Legal Expense Trust Fund, which helped to cover Vice President Mike Pence's legal bills generated during the Mueller investigation. Weiser was a Michigan delegate to the 2020 Republican National Convention; the 73-member Michigan delegation was unanimously for Trump. In the 2020 election cycle, Weiser and his wife gave $1.6 million to Republican causes, including nearly $168,000 to support Republican state House candidates.

In March 2021 Weiser came under criticism after he was filmed in a speech to a Republican club calling three Democratic state officials — Governor Gretchen Whitmer, Attorney General Dana Nessel, and Secretary of State Jocelyn Benson — "witches" who were ready to be "burned at the stake" in the next election. When asked how to get rid of Republican congressmen Fred Upton and Peter Meijer, who have been widely vilified because they voted to impeach Trump, Weiser replied that "other than assassination," the only way to remove them is to vote them out. After the remarks were publicized, causing an uproar, Weiser said, "I apologize to those I offended for the flippant analogy about three women who are elected officials and for the off-hand comments about two other leaders." He claimed that he had never advocated for violence and added, "While I will always fight for the people and policies I believe in, I pledge to be part of a respectful political dialogue going forward."

University of Michigan Board of Regents chair Denise Ilitch introduced a resolution condemning Weiser's statement and called him to resign from the board; the resolution passed 5–0 at the April 2, 2021 meeting, with Weiser and Sarah Hubbard abstaining, and one regent absent. Ilitch added that "It has become clear that serving as chair of a statewide political party is simply not compatible with serving on this board." Weiser, however, refused to resign, saying, "I regret my poorly chosen words that were offhand remarks made at a private Republican Party meeting" but that "I will not be cancelled."

In 2021, Weiser was the primary contributor of a petition campaign to impose new voter ID requirements in Michigan. Weiser’s efforts followed the previous year’s controversial presidential election, despite there being no evidence of widespread voter fraud in that election.

Personal life
He married Eileen in 1983, and was divorced in 2021. Weiser lives in Ann Arbor. The Weisers have two married children, Elizabeth and Marc, and five grandchildren.

Weiser is on the Atlantic Council's Board of Directors.

References

|-

|-

|-

1945 births
21st-century American diplomats
Ambassadors of the United States to Slovakia
Living people
Michigan Republican Party chairs
Michigan Republicans
Ross School of Business alumni
Regents of the University of Michigan